Rickey Hatley (born March 29, 1994) is a former American football defensive tackle. He played college football at Missouri.

Professional career

Houston Texans
Hatley signed with the Houston Texans as an undrafted free agent on May 12, 2017. He was waived by the Texans on September 2, 2017.

Kansas City Chiefs
On September 12, 2017, Hatley was signed to the Kansas City Chiefs' practice squad. He was released on September 19, 2017. He was re-signed on November 13, 2017. He was released again on December 14, 2017.

Buffalo Bills
On December 23, 2017, Hatley was signed to the Buffalo Bills' practice squad. He was promoted to the active roster on December 26, 2017.

On September 1, 2018, Hatley was waived by the Bills.

Birmingham Iron
On October 12, 2018, Hatley signed with the Birmingham Iron of the Alliance of American Football. The league ceased operations in April 2019.

References

External links
Missouri Tigers bio

1994 births
Living people
American football defensive tackles
Missouri Tigers football players
Houston Texans players
Kansas City Chiefs players
Buffalo Bills players
Birmingham Iron players
Players of American football from Texas
People from Atlanta, Texas